Romansrivier, in Ward 2 Dwarsrivier, is a settlement in Witzenberg Local Municipality, Cape Winelands District Municipality, Western Cape province, South Africa. It is in the upper Breede River Valley region. Rte. 43 (Michell's Pass Road) runs north-south past the settlement. The Romanrivier railway station is located just south of the settlement. The Witteberg Nature Reserve is just east of the settlement.

History
When the Dutch arrived in the Dwarsrivier area it was inhabited by the San people (Bushmen). Dutch "Free Burghers" (vryburgers) first settled there in 1687.

Notes and references

External links
 

Populated places in the Witzenberg Local Municipality